Cecile Arlene Feldman-Zohn is an American dental scientist who is a professor and Dean of the School of Dental Medicine at the Rutgers University. Her research considers dental informatics and health services research. She was elected Fellow of the American Association for the Advancement of Science in 2020.

Early life and education 
Feldman was an undergraduate student at the University of Pennsylvania. During her second year, she decided she wanted to study dentistry and accelerated her course to complete in three years. She remained at the University for her dental degree, where she focused on patient care. She completed a Master of Business Administration in health care administration. As a dentistry student, she played piccolo in The University of Pennsylvania Band.

Research and career 
In 1988, Feldman joined the New Jersey Dental School (now Rutgers School of Dental Medicine). She was made Director of Information Services in 1990 and Associate Dean for Planning in 1998.

Feldman works on dental informatics and the research of health services. In 2001, Feldman was made Dean of the Rutgers School of Medicine. She is on the Board of the Eastman Institute for Oral Health. She has campaigned to bring better dental care to veterans.

Feldman has researched how the combination of ibuprofen and acetaminophen can be used as an alternative to opioids. During the COVID-19 pandemic, Feldman started a clinical trial to understand the prevalence of COVID-19 amongst dental healthcare workers. She switched the region's dental practice to a fully telemedicine service, and shifted their training to a digital curriculum.

Selected publications

References 

Living people
University of Pennsylvania alumni
Rutgers University faculty
American women scientists
Fellows of the American Association for the Advancement of Science
Year of birth missing (living people)